The Battle of Hartville was fought January 9–11, 1863, in Wright County, Missouri, as part of John S. Marmaduke's first expedition into Missouri, during the American Civil War.

Background

Marmaduke led a Confederate raid into Missouri in early January 1863. This movement was two-pronged. Col. Joseph C. Porter led one column, comprising his Missouri Cavalry Brigade, out of Pocahontas, Arkansas, to assault Union posts around Hartville, Missouri. When he neared Hartville on January 9, he sent a detachment forward to reconnoiter. It succeeded in capturing the small militia garrison. The same day, Porter moved toward Marshfield. On January 10, some of Porter's men raided other Union installations in the area before making contact with Marmaduke's column east of Marshfield. Marmaduke had received reports of Union troops approaching to surround him and prepared for a confrontation.

On January 10, Col. Samuel Merrill commanded an approaching Union relief column from Houston, Missouri. He and his command arrived in Hartville that morning, discovered that the small garrison had already surrendered, and set out toward Springfield.  His force went into camp on Wood's Fork of the Gasconade River.  Early on the morning of January 11 the approaching Confederates under Porter made contact with Merrill's scouts and skirmishing commenced.

Opposing forces

Union
Colonel Samuel Merrill
99th Illinois Infantry - Lt. Col. Lemuel Parke
21st Iowa Infantry - Lt. Col. C.W. Dunlap (w)
3rd Iowa Cavalry (detachment)- Maj. George Duffield
3rd Missouri Cavalry (detachment) - Capt. Thomas G. Black
2nd Missouri Artillery, Battery L (section) - Lt. William Waldschmidt

Confederate
Brig. Gen. John S. Marmaduke
Shelby's Brigade - Col. J.O. Shelby
1st Missouri Cavalry - Lt. Col. B.F. Gordon - Maj. George R. Kirtley (k)
2nd Missouri Cavalry - Lt. Col. C.A. Gilkey
3rd Missouri Cavalry - Col. G.W. Thompson
1st Battn. Missouri Cavalry - Maj. Ben Elliott
Quantrill's Partisan Rangers - Lt. William H. Gregg

Porter's Brigade - Col. Joseph C. Porter (mw)
Burbridges' Regt. - Lt. Col. John M. Wimer (k)
Green's Regt. - Lt. Col. L.C. Campbell
Jeffers' Regt. - Col. William M. Jeffers

Not Brigaded
MacDonald's Missouri Regt. - Col. Emmett MacDonald (k)

Artillery
Capt. Brown's Arkansas Battery - Capt. Louis T. Brown 
Lt. Collins' Section of Bledsoe's Battery (later Collins' Battery) - Lt. Richard A. Collins

Based on Frederick Goman's order of battle, except where noted.

Battle
Marmaduke believed he was being pressed by several forces, so he diverted Porter and Shelby's columns along another road to Hartville. Meanwhile, observing this movement, Merrill marched his force directly to Hartville where it took a strong defensive position on covered, high ground west of the courthouse. Shelby and Porter's brigades attempted to dislodge Merrill's force, but it was too strongly positioned. Over a four-hour period several Confederate assaults were made, each being repulsed in turn. Eventually Merrill withdrew most of his force, although a third of the men under Lt. Col Dunlap never received the order and remained on the field until nightfall.

Aftermath

Elements of both sides observed the other withdrawing from the field as night approached, and both claimed victory as a result. The real results were mixed. From the Union command's perspective they had repulsed Marmaduke's assaults inflicting heavy casualties, but the Federals had been forced to leave the field. From the Confederate perspective Marmaduke had united his force and secured his line of withdrawal. He set up a field hospital in town and could claim to control the field briefly. However, he was compelled to make a rapid retreat into Arkansas and then an arduous trek to winter camp. Additionally, the frontal assaults had resulted in the death or mortal wounding of several senior CSA officers including: brigade commander Col. Joseph C. Porter, Col. Emmett MacDonald, Lt. Col. John Wimer, and Major George R. Kirtley.

The raid itself caused great disruption of Federal forces in the region and a number of small outposts had been overrun, destroyed, or abandoned. However, the other major objective, the depot at Springfield, remained in Union hands. The successful escape of the raiding party did foreshadow the vulnerability of Federal Missouri to fast-moving expeditions.

References

 National Park Service battle description
 Goman, Frederick W., Up From Arkansas:  Marmaduke's First Missouri Raid Including the Battles of Springfield and Hartville, 1999
 Historical Society of Wright County, Missouri, The Civil War Battle of Hartville and Related Events, 1997
 Mudd, Joseph A., With Porter In North Missouri, 1904
 Robinett, Paul M., Marmaduke's Expedition into Missouri:  The Battles of Springfield and Hartville, January, 1863, Missouri Historical Review, January 1964
 “Marmaduke’s Expedition into Missouri”. Index to the Miscellaneous Documents of the House of Representatives. Congressional edition, Volume 2580. United States Congress. U.S. Government Printing Office, 1889. https://books.google.com/books?id=bEBHAQAAIAAJ

Hartville
Hartville
Hartville
Hartville
Wright County, Missouri
Hartville
1863 in Missouri
January 1863 events